Erin Hunter is a collective pseudonym used by the authors Victoria Holmes, Kate Cary, Cherith Baldry, Clarissa Hutton, Inbali Iserles, Tui T. Sutherland, and Rosie Best in the writing of several juvenile fantasy novel series, which focus on animals and their adventures. Notable works include the Warriors, Seekers, Survivors, Bravelands, and Bamboo Kingdom book series. Each of the authors play a different role in the production of the books: Holmes creates the plot for each book, and the others take turns writing the books. Dan Jolley, though not an official Erin Hunter author, also writes the stories for manga published under the Hunter name.

History
In the year 2003, HarperCollins asked Victoria Holmes to write a fantasy series about feral cats, but, not being a reader of fantasy, she was less than enthusiastic, despite her love of cats. After writing one storyline, Kate Cary was brought in to write the book as Holmes went behind the scenes to supervise details and edit the book. Then, on the third book, Forest of Secrets, Cherith Baldry joined Erin Hunter. Later, after Sutherland wrote the first Warriors field guide, she became the fourth Erin Hunter.

The name "Erin Hunter" was chosen for several reasons. First, if the authors used all of their own names, the books would be placed in different places in a library, making them hard to find. Second, they wanted to pick a surname that would place the books very close to the Redwall series by Brian Jacques, which was, at the time, the book series with the closest plot to Warriors. One of the authors suggested "Hunter", and the others found that it was "perfect" because not only did it place the book series close to Jacques, but it evokes the image of a cat. Victoria Holmes suggested ‘Erin' because she liked the name. One of Victoria Holmes's favorite given names is Erin, and it was accepted for being a strong Celtic name and "not particularly girly".

Members

Victoria Holmes

Victoria Holmes was born in Berkshire, England. Holmes was the original author of the series with HarperCollins requesting her to write the series. After inviting Kate Cary to do the actual writing of the book, she moved behind the scenes to help edit and supervise the details.

Holmes grew up on a farm in England. She learned how to ride horses at age two. Later she attended Oxford University, whose buildings "inspired an interest in history". She now lives in London where she works as the editor for the series.

On 5 April 2011, the Bookperk website ran a special for signed copies of Warriors: Omen of the Stars #4: Sign of the Moon.  Because Erin Hunter is not an actual person, these books were instead signed by Victoria Holmes.

Following a diagnosis of cancer in 2017, Holmes stepped back from her involvement in Warriors.

Kate Cary

Kate Cary was the second author brought on board to write for the Warriors series. Holmes chose Cary to write the first book after Holmes had finished one storyline. In the first series (The Prophecies Begin) she wrote Into the Wild, Fire and Ice and Rising Storm. In the second series (The New Prophecy) she wrote Dawn. In the third series (Power of Three) she wrote The Sight, Dark River and Eclipse. In the fourth series (Omen of The Stars) she wrote Fading Echoes and The Last Hope.

She was born in England on 4 November 1967. She later moved to Scotland where she lived for 12 years before going back to England where she currently resides. Besides the Warriors series, she has also written the book Bloodline, and its sequel, Reckoning.

Cherith Baldry

Cherith Baldry was the third author brought in to the Erin Hunter team. She was born on 21 January 1947. Holmes invited her to join when they were writing the third book, Forest of Secrets, after seeing her writing style and feeling that it was similar to Kate Cary's.

Tui T. Sutherland

Tui T. Sutherland was born in Caracas, Venezuela, but currently lives in the United States, which makes her the only non-British author of the series. Her first credit to the Erin Hunter team was the field guide Secrets of the Clans. Sutherland was also an editor of the Warriors series, until she quit editing to become a full-time writer. She went on to write the novel series Wings of Fire.

Inbali Iserles
Inbali Iserles has written three books so far, the third, fifth and sixth books of the Survivors series: Darkness Falls, The Endless Lake and Storm of Dogs. She also publishes animal fantasy novels under her own name, including The Tygrine Cat and the Foxcraft trilogy.

Gillian Philip
Gillian Philip is the author of The Empty City and A Hidden Enemy, the first two books in the Survivors series. She lives in the northeast Scottish Highlands. Philip has toured the United States twice as the face of the Erin Hunter responsible for Survivors. In addition to Survivors, she has written the Rebel Angels series (Firebrand, Bloodstone, Wolfsbane and the forthcoming Icefall); the Darke Academy series, and young adult novels including Bad Faith, Crossing The Line and The Opposite of Amber. As of July 2020, Philip no longer writes Erin Hunter books. She was removed from the Erin Hunter team after making transphobic statements.

Clarissa Hutton 
Clarissa Hutton is the author of several Warriors books, including Thunderstar's Echo and the three stories in Path of a Warrior.

Works

Warriors

Warriors: The Prophecies Begin

Into the Wild (2003) (Kate Cary)
Fire and Ice (2003) (Cary)
Forest of Secrets (2003) (Cherith Baldry)
Rising Storm (2004) (Cary)
A Dangerous Path (2004) (Baldry)
The Darkest Hour (2004) (Baldry)

Warriors: The New Prophecy

Midnight (2005) (Baldry)
Moonrise (2005) (Baldry)
Dawn (2005) (Cary)
Starlight (2006) (Baldry)
Twilight(2006) (Baldry)
Sunset (2007) (Baldry)

Warriors: Power of Three

The Sight (2007) (Cary)
Dark River (2007) (Cary)
Outcast (2008) (Baldry)
Eclipse (2008) (Cary)
Long Shadows (2008) (Baldry)
Sunrise (2009) (Baldry)

Warriors: Omen of the Stars

The Fourth Apprentice (2009) (Baldry)
Fading Echoes (2010) (Cary)
Night Whispers (2010) (Cary)
Sign of the Moon (2011) (Baldry)
The Forgotten Warrior (2011) (Baldry)
The Last Hope (2012) (Cary)

Warriors: Dawn of the Clans

The Sun Trail (2013) (Baldry)
Thunder Rising (2013) (Baldry)
The First Battle (2014) (Cary) 
The Blazing Star (2014) (Baldry)
A Forest Divided (2015) (Cary)
Path of Stars (2015) (Cary)

Warriors: A Vision of Shadows

The Apprentice's Quest (2016) (Baldry)
Thunder and Shadow (2016) (Cary)
Shattered Sky (2017) (Baldry) 
Darkest Night (2017) (Cary)
River of Fire (2018) (Baldry) 
The Raging Storm (2018) (Cary) 

Warriors: The Broken Code

Lost Stars (2019) (Baldry) 
The Silent Thaw (2019) (Tui T. Sutherland) 
Veil of Shadows (2020) (Baldry)
Darkness Within (2020) (Cary)
The Place of No Stars (2021) (Baldry)
A Light in the Mist (2021) (Cary)

Warriors: A Starless Clan

River (2022) (Baldry)
Sky (2022) (Cary)
Shadow (2023) (Baldry)
Thunder (2023) (Cary)

Graystripe's Adventure

The Lost Warrior (2007) (Dan Jolley)
Warrior's Refuge (2007) (Jolley)
Warrior's Return (2008) (Jolley)

The Rise of Scourge

The Rise of Scourge (2008) (Jolley)

Tigerstar and Sasha

Into the Woods (2008) (Jolley)
Escape from the Forest (2009) (Jolley)
Return to the Clans (2009) (Jolley)

Ravenpaw's Path

Shattered Peace (2009) (Jolley)
A Clan in Need (2010) (Jolley)
The Heart of a Warrior (2010) (Jolley)

SkyClan and the Stranger

The Rescue (2011) (Jolley)
Beyond the Code (2011) (Jolley)
After the Flood (2012) (Jolley)

A Shadow in RiverClan

A Shadow in RiverClan (2020) (Jolley)

Winds of Change

Winds of Change (2021) (Jolley)

Exile from ShadowClan

Exile from ShadowClan (2022) (Jolley)

A Thief In ThunderClan

A Thief In ThunderClan (2023) (Jolley)
Super Editions

Firestar's Quest (2007) (Baldry)
Bluestar's Prophecy (2009) (Cary)
SkyClan's Destiny (2010) (Baldry)
Crookedstar's Promise (2011) (Cary)
Yellowfang's Secret (2012) (Baldry)
Tallstar's Revenge (2013) (Cary)
Bramblestar's Storm (2014) (Baldry)
Moth Flight's Vision (2015) (Cary)
Hawkwing's Journey (2016) (Baldry)
Tigerheart's Shadow (2017) (Cary)
Crowfeather's Trial (2018) (Baldry)
Squirrelflight's Hope (2019) (Cary) 
Graystripe's Vow (2020) (Baldry) 
Leopardstar's Honor (2021) (Cary)
Onestar's Confession (2022)
Riverstar's Home (2023)

Field guides

Secrets of the Clans (2007) (Sutherland)
Cats of the Clans (2008) (Victoria Holmes)
Code of the Clans (2009) (Sutherland)
Battles of the Clans (2010) (Sutherland)
Enter the Clans (2012) (Bind-up of Secrets of the Clans and Code of the Clans)
The Warriors Guide (2012)
Warriors: The Ultimate Guide (2013) (Holmes)

Novellas 

Hollyleaf's Story (2012) (Holmes)
Mistystar's Omen (2012) (Holmes)
Cloudstar's Journey (2013) (Holmes)
The Untold Stories (2013) (Bind-up of Hollyleaf's Story, Mistystar's Omen and Cloudstar's Journey)

Tigerclaw's Fury (2014) (Holmes)
Leafpool's Wish (2014) (Holmes)
Dovewing's Silence (2014) (Holmes)
Tales from the Clans (2014) (Bind-up of Tigerclaw's Fury, Leafpool's Wish and Dovewing's Silence)

Mapleshade's Vengeance (2015) (Holmes)
Goosefeather's Curse (2015) (Holmes)
Ravenpaw's Farewell (2016) (Holmes)
Shadows of the Clans (2016) (Bind-up of Mapleshade's Vengeance, Goosefeather's Curse and Ravenpaw's Farewell)

Spottedleaf's Heart (2017) (Holmes)
Pinestar's Choice (2017) (Holmes)
Thunderstar's Echo (2017) (Hutton)
Legends of the Clans (2017) (Bind-up of Spottedleaf's Heart, Pinestar's Choice and Thunderstar's Echo)

Redtail's Debt (2019) (Hutton)
Tawnypelt's Clan (2019) (Hutton)
Shadowstar's Life (2019) (Hutton)
Path of a Warrior (2019) (Bind-up of Redtail's Debt, Tawnypelt's Clan and Shadowstar's Life) (Hutton)

Pebbleshine's Kits (2020) (Baldry)
Tree's Roots (2020)
Mothwing's Secret (2020)
A Warrior's Spirit (2020) (Bind-up of Pebbleshine's Kits, Tree's Roots and Mothwing's Secret)

Daisy's Kin (2021) (Cherith)
Blackfoot's Reckoning (2021)
Spotfur's Rebellion (2021)
A Warrior's Choice (2021) (Bind-up of Daisy's Kin, Blackfoot's Reckoning and Spotfur's Rebellion)

Short stories

Spottedleaf's Honest Answer (2008) (Holmes)
The Clans Decide (2009) (Holmes)
After Sunset: The Right Choice? (2011) (Holmes)
The Elders' Concern (2011) (Holmes)

Plays

After Sunset: We Need to Talk (2007) (Holmes)
Beyond the Code: Brightspirit's Mercy (2009) (Baldry)

Seekers
Seekers: The Original Series

The Quest Begins (2008) (Sutherland)
Great Bear Lake (2009) (Baldry)
Smoke Mountain (2009) (Sutherland)
The Last Wilderness (2010) (Baldry)
Fire in the Sky (2010) (Sutherland)
Spirits in the Stars (2011) (Baldry)

Seekers: Return to the Wild
Island of Shadows (2012) (Baldry)
The Melting Sea (2012) (Sutherland)
River of Lost Bears (2013) (Baldry)
Forest of Wolves (2014) (Baldry)
The Burning Horizon (2015) (Baldry)
The Longest Day (2016) (Baldry)
Manga
Toklo's Story (2010)
Kallik's Adventure (2011)
Lusa's Tale (cancelled)

Survivors
Survivors: The Original Series
The Empty City (2012) (Gillian Philip)
A Hidden Enemy (2013) (Philip)
Darkness Falls (2013) (Inbali Iserles)
The Broken Path (2014) (Philip)
The Endless Lake (2014) (Iserles)
Storm of Dogs (2015) (Iserles)

Survivors: The Gathering Darkness
A Pack Divided (2015) (Philip)
Dead of Night (2016) (Rosie Best)
Into the Shadows (2017)
Red Moon Rising (2017)
The Exile's Journey (2018)
The Final Battle (2019)

Novellas
Alpha's Tale (2014) (Phillip)
Sweet's Journey (2015) (Philip)
Moon's Choice (2015) (Philip)
Tales from the Packs (2015) (Bind-up of Alpha's Tale, Sweet's Journey, and Moon's Choice)

Bravelands
Bravelands
Broken Pride (2017) (Philip)
Code of Honor (2018) (Philip)
Blood and Bone (2018)
Shifting Shadows (2019)
The Spirit Eaters (2020)
Oathkeeper (2020)
Bravelands: Curse of the Sandtongues

 Shadows on the Mountain (2021)
 The Venom Spreads (2022)
 Blood on the Plains (2022)

Bravelands: Thunder on the Plains

 The Shattered Horn (2023)

Bamboo Kingdom 

 Creatures of the Flood (2021)
River of Secrets (2022)
Journey to the Dragon Mountain (2023)
The Dark Sun (2023)

Book development

In Warriors, Seekers and Bravelands, a specific order is followed. First, Holmes, the editor, sends in the preliminary script and outline to Cary, Baldry or Sutherland, depending on who writes the book. Then, the author develops Holmes' ideas into a single book which is sent back to Holmes for one last check-over and edit. After she finishes, she sends it to HarperCollins for publication. After Holmes stepped back from editing under the Erin Hunter name in 2017, a team of editors took over the writing of the preliminary scripts and the editing of drafts.

For the Survivors series, there was a different approach taken. The whole team got together and created a detailed story outline and developed the characters together. Then, the writing itself was done by a single author, who was still allowed to change something significant about the plot or characters if they felt that a certain character would not act a specific way.

Writing style
With four different authors, Holmes has said that the book "'sounds' like Erin, because she has a very distinctive voice". She compares the style of the authors to a different language where a stray line or word can stick out. Holmes says that she is in charge of editing and making sure that the book sounds correct. Erin Hunter books are all told in a third person limited narrative, though the focal point character changes from series to series, book to book, and sometimes from chapter to chapter.

References

External links
 Warriors (official)
 
 

British children's writers
Warriors (novel series)
Fantasy shared pseudonyms
Pseudonymous women writers
21st-century pseudonymous writers